The 2016 United States presidential election in South Dakota was held on November 8, 2016, as part of the 2016 United States presidential election in which all 50 states plus the District of Columbia participated. South Dakota voters chose electors to represent them in the Electoral College via a popular vote pitting the Republican Party's nominee, celebrity Donald Trump, and running mate Indiana Governor Mike Pence against Democratic Party nominee, former Secretary of State Hillary Clinton and her running mate, Virginia Senator Tim Kaine.

South Dakota has voted for the Republican ticket in every election since 1968. Donald Trump continued the Republican tradition in South Dakota, carrying the state with 61.5% of the vote, to Hillary Clinton's 31.7% of the vote, a 29.8% margin of victory, the largest margin of victory for a candidate of either party since Republican Dwight D. Eisenhower's 38.5% margin in 1952. South Dakota was also Libertarian Party candidate Gary Johnson's fifth strongest state in the 2016 election, which his 5.63% in popular vote being only behind New Mexico, North Dakota, Alaska and Oklahoma.

Primary elections

Democratic primary

Two candidates appeared on the Democratic presidential primary ballot:
Hillary Clinton
Bernie Sanders

Republican primary

Three candidates appeared on the Republican presidential primary ballot. The only candidate with a campaign that remained active was Donald Trump. Trump's state director was Neal Tapio.
Ted Cruz (withdrawn)
John Kasich (withdrawn)
Donald Trump

General Election

Predictions
The following are final 2016 predictions from various organizations for South Dakota as of Election Day.

Statewide Results

Results by county
Unofficial results by county last updated November 9, 2016.

Counties that flipped from Democratic to Republican

 Day (largest town: Webster)
 Corson (largest city: McLaughlin)
 Marshall (largest city: Britton)
 Roberts (largest city: Sisseston)
 Ziebach (largest city: Dupree)

By congressional district
South Dakota has only one congressional district because of its small population compared to other states. This district, called the At-Large district because it covers the entire state, is equivalent to the statewide election results.

Analysis
South Dakota gave Republican nominee Donald Trump a more than 29-point margin of victory over Democratic rival Hillary Clinton, thus gaining him three electoral votes. The Mount Rushmore state's politics are driven by agrarian conservatism, with the eastern portion of the state being largely rural and considered an extension of the Corn Belt. The western portion of the state is even more conservative. South Dakota, like many neighboring majority-white Great Plains and prairie states in the Farm Belt, has not voted for a Democratic candidate since the landslide election of Lyndon B. Johnson in 1964.

Donald Trump carried most of the state's counties, including Hughes County where the capital city of Pierre is located, Pennington County which contains Rapid City, Minnehaha County which contains Sioux Falls, Brown County which contains Aberdeen, and Codington County which contains Watertown. Clinton won only five counties statewide: Todd, Buffalo, Dewey, and Oglala Lakota, all of which are majority Native American, and Clay County which contains the University of South Dakota. However, Trump did fare well with some Native American groups, and thus held the Native American-majority counties of Bennett, Corson, Mellette and Ziebach, along with the plurality-Native county of Jackson. Distinctly noticeable were the split of both the Pine Ridge and Standing Rock reservations votes and the majority-Native counties they contained: the western half of Pine Ridge (Oglala Lakota County) voted Democrat, while eastern Pine Ridge (Bennett and Jackson Counties) voted Republican, and while northern Standing Rock (Sioux County) remained heavily Democratic, southern Standing Rock (Corson County) swung Republican for the first time in three elections.

See also
 Presidency of Donald Trump
 United States presidential elections in South Dakota
 2016 Democratic Party presidential debates and forums
 2016 Democratic Party presidential primaries
 2016 Republican Party presidential debates and forums
 2016 Republican Party presidential primaries

References

SD
2016
Presidential